Legio III Diocletiana was a comitatensis Roman legion, levied in 296 by Diocletian, from whom the legion took its name. The aim of this unit was to guard the newly re-organized province of Aegyptus, being based in Alexandria. It was created to support II Traiana Fortis, and therefore it took the numeral III.

The Papyri Beatty Panopolis contains records of some vexillationes of the III Diocletiana stationed in the south of Egypt, at Thebes and Syene (modern Aswan). These provide information about provisioning, pay (which was often in arrears), and unit sizes.

Theodosius I sent soldiers from the north to III Diocletiana in Egypt, and Egyptian soldiers in Macedonia, forming the III Diocletiana Thebaeorum, under the command of the Magister Militum per Thracias (Notitia Dignitatum Orientis, VIII). The shield pattern of III Diocletiana Thebaeorum was a red rose on white field.

See also
List of Roman legions

References

External links 
 Livius.org: Account of Legio III Diocletiana

03 Diocletiana
Roman Egypt
03 Diocletiana
Military units and formations established in the 3rd century
4th century in Egypt
296 establishments
290s establishments in the Roman Empire